The KBC Void (or Local Hole) is an immense, comparatively empty region of space, named after astronomers Ryan Keenan, Amy Barger, and Lennox Cowie, who studied it in 2013. The existence of a local underdensity has been the subject of many pieces of literature and research articles.

The underdensity is proposed to be roughly spherical, approximately 2 billion light-years (600 megaparsecs, Mpc) in diameter. As with other voids, it is not completely empty but contains the Milky Way, the Local Group, and the larger part of the Laniakea Supercluster. The Milky Way is within a few hundred million light-years of the void's center.

It is debated whether the existence of the KBC void is consistent with the ΛCDM model. While Haslbauer et al. say that voids as large as the KBC void are inconsistent with ΛCDM, Sahlén et al. argue that the existence of supervoids such as the KBC void is consistent with ΛCDM. Galaxies inside a void experience a gravitational pull from outside the void, which yields a larger local value for the Hubble constant, a cosmological measure of how fast the universe expands. Some authors have proposed the structure as the cause of the discrepancy between measurements of the Hubble constant using galactic supernovae and Cepheid variables (72–75 km/s/Mpc) and from the cosmic microwave background and baryon acoustic oscillation data (67–68 km/s/Mpc). However, other work has found no evidence for this in observations, finding the scale of the claimed underdensity to be incompatible with observations which extend beyond its radius. Important deficiencies were subsequently pointed out in this analysis, leaving open the possibility that the Hubble tension is indeed caused by outflow from the KBC void, albeit in the context of MOND gravity rather than general relativity.

See also
 Void (astronomy)
 Giant Void
 Local Void
 Observable universe
 List of largest voids
 Hubble bubble (astronomy)
 Northern Local Supervoid
 Southern Local Supervoid

References

Further reading
 

Voids (astronomy)
2013 in science